Freerunner or free runner may refer to:

 Freerunning
 Freerunner (film)
 Free Runners, an English-language manga about free running
 Neo FreeRunner
 A baserunner placed on second base in extra innings in baseball or softball

See also 
 Free run (disambiguation)
 Free running (disambiguation)